is a 2018 Japanese kaiju film directed by Hiroto Yokokawa. The film was based on the lost 1934 film of the same name, made with the cooperation of director Yoshiro Edamasa's grandson. Additional footage with new actors was shot to extend the film's run time for international distribution, with still more footage shot for a Japanese theatrical release on September 4, 2020, termed the Final Edition.

Cast

Background

In his youth the film's director Hiroto Yokokawa was introduced by a friend to the Godzilla series about the existence of The Great Buddha Arrival. In 2016, he contacted Kazuyoshi Fohara, the grandson of Yoshiro Edamasa, and the project started.

Production

Actors who have appeared in Tokusatsu films (such as Godzilla, Gamera) that influenced Yokokawa, such as Akira Takarada and Yukijiro Hotaru, were appointed. There is. Although 80% of the offers were declined, some casts decided to appear because "if Mr. Takarada will appear".

Part of the production cost is raised by Crowdfunding, and when the article was published in Yahoo! News, United States producer Avery Guerra translated the article into English. that the existence of this work became known overseas because of the introduction, and there are also overseas actors (Philip Granger etc.) who decided to appear as a result.

Home media 
The film will soon be released in North America by SRS Cinema.

See also 

 Nezura 1964

References

External links 

 Official website
 

2018 films
Kaiju films
Giant monster films
Tokusatsu films
2010s Japanese films